Savissivik (West Greenlandic; old spelling: Savigsivik) or Havighivik (Inuktun)  is a settlement in the Avannaata municipality in northern Greenland. Located on Meteorite Island, off the northern shores of Melville Bay, the settlement had 55 inhabitants in 2020.

History 
In the Greenlandic language, the name Savissivik means "Place of Meteoric Iron" or "Knives", alluding to the numerous meteorite fragments that have been found in the area dating to about 10,000 years ago. The Cape York meteorite is estimated to have weighed 100 tonnes before it exploded. The iron from the meteorite is believed to have attracted migrating Inuit from Arctic Canada.

Transport 

Air Greenland operates settlement flights to Qaanaaq Airport via Thule Air Base. The twice-weekly flights are subsidized by the Government of Greenland. Transfers at the airbase are subject to access restrictions by the Danish Foreign Ministry.

Population 
The population of Savissivik decreased by over 40 percent relative to the 1990 levels, and by 10 percent relative to 2000 levels.

References 

Populated places in Greenland
Populated places of Arctic Greenland